Harry Stafford may refer to:

 Harry Stafford (1869–1940), English footballer
 Harry Stafford (motorcyclist) (born 1993), British motorcycle racer
 Harry Stafford (American football) (1912–2004, as Albert Harrison Stafford), American football player

See also

 Godfrey Harry Stafford (1920–2013), British physicist
 Stafford (surname)
 
 Henry Stafford (disambiguation)
 Stafford (disambiguation)